Are(A)zione is the fourth album of the Jazz fusion band Area. It is Area's first live album. It was recorded during their 1975 Italian tour, with dates in Milan, Naples, Rimini and Reggio Emilia, and released later the same year. 

The first of the album concentrates on live versions of some of the band's classics, the flip side features the title-track and a lengthy instrumental which introduces the drum pattern of the song "Giro, Giro, Tondo" (later to be included in the band's following studio album Maledetti (Maudits)), and closes with the Socialist anthem "L'internazionale" as covered by the band in a 1974 single.

The track timings listed on the back cover are slightly incorrect. The actual running time for each track is reported below.

Track listing 
All tracks by Patrizio Fariselli, Ares Tavolazzi & Giampaolo Tofani

Side one 
 "Luglio, Agosto, Settembre (nero)" – 5:41
 "La Mela di Odessa" – 11:05
 "Cometa Rossa" – 6:00

Side two 
 "Are(A)zione" – 15:00
 "L'Internazionale" – 4:00

Personnel 
 Giulio Capiozzo - drums, percussion
 Patrizio Fariselli - electric piano, piano, clarinet, synthesizer
 Demetrio Stratos - vocals, organ, harpsichord, steel drums, percussion
 Ares Tavolazzi - bass, trombone
 Giampaolo Tofani - guitar, synthesizer, flute

References 

Area (band) albums
1975 live albums